Alyssa Alano (born Geramie Daud; 11 August 1987) is a Philippine-Australian film and TV actress. She was a former member of the popular Viva Hot Babes franchise.

Although she grew up in Tarlac, she was born Geramie Daud in Zamboanga City on 11 August 1987, to a Philippine mother and an Australian father of Spanish descent (who later abandoned her and her mother).

Notable appearances

"Keys Me"
During an appearance on GMA's late night variety show Walang Tulugan with the Master Showman in June 2006, Alano performed a cover of the song "Kiss Me" by Sixpence None the Richer. The performance would become a viral video in the country after a user uploaded a mondegreened version of the performance to YouTube, with karaoke subtitles of her accented lyrics, which among other things, rendered the title of the song as "Keys Me."

Alano did not know about the video until it was shown to her during an interview on 24 Oras "Chika Minute" segment. After discovering the video, she reacted positively, and credited the video for her growing popularity.

Una Kang Naging Akin
In 2008, Alano played the role of Maan in the afternoon drama Una Kang Naging Akin top-billed by Angelika dela Cruz and Maxene Magalona.

Ang Babaeng Hinugot sa Aking Tadyang
In 2009, she joined the cast of the adaptation of Carlo J. Caparas's thriller Ang Babaeng Hinugot sa Aking Tadyang as Yaya Citas.

Darna
In 2009, Alano was selected to play Marissa (the Flora Venom), one of Darna's enemies. As the story continues she gets her power with Lucefera (Ang Babaeng Tuod) who is portrayed by Francine Prieto. Flora Venom has an ability to kill people by shooting venom out of her mouth.

Full House
Alano is currently doing a new project on the GMA Network, a remake of the Korean hit comedy romance Full House, starring Heart Evangelista and Isabel Oli.

Filmography

Television

Movies

Awards and nominations

References

External links

Alyssa Alano at the VIVA Entertainment website

1987 births
Filipino film actresses
Filipino television actresses
Filipino people of Australian descent
Participants in Philippine reality television series
Survivor Philippines contestants
Filipino people of Spanish descent
Filipino Internet celebrities
Living people
People from Zamboanga City
GMA Network personalities
TV5 (Philippine TV network) personalities